Half-Life 2 is a 2004 first-person shooter (FPS) game developed by Valve. It was published by Valve through its distribution service Steam. Like the original Half-Life (1998), Half-Life 2 combines shooting, puzzles, and storytelling, and adds features such as vehicles and physics-based gameplay. Players control Gordon Freeman as he joins a resistance movement to liberate the Earth from the control of an alien empire, the Combine.

Half-Life 2 was created using Valve's Source engine, which was developed at the same time. Development lasted five years and cost $40million. Valve's president, Gabe Newell, set his team the goal of redefining the FPS genre. They integrated the Havok physics engine, which simulates real-world physics, to reinforce the player's sense of presence and create new gameplay, and developed the characterization, with more detailed character models and realistic animation.

Valve announced Half-Life 2 at E3 2003, with a release date for that September. It was delayed by over a year, triggering a backlash. A year before release, an unfinished version was stolen by a hacker and leaked online, which damaged team morale and slowed development.

Half-Life 2 was released on Steam on November 16, 2004, and received universal acclaim. It won 39 Game of the Year awards and has been cited as one of the best games ever made. By 2011, it had sold 12 million copies. Half-Life 2 was followed by the free extra level Lost Coast (2005) and the episodic sequels Episode One (2006) and Episode Two (2007). In 2020, after canceling Episode Three and several further Half-Life projects, Valve released a prequel, Half-Life: Alyx.

Gameplay 

Like the original Half-Life (1998), Half-Life 2 is a single-player first-person shooter (FPS) in which players control Gordon Freeman. It has similar mechanics to Half-Life, including health-and-weapon systems  (though with less overall weapons) and periodic physics puzzles, except with the newer Source engine and improved graphics. The player also starts without items, slowly building up their arsenal over the course of the game. Despite the game's mainly linear nature, much effort was put into making exploration rewarding and interesting; many optional areas can be missed or avoided.

A diverse set of enemies is present, which usually require being approached with different tactics: some coordinate in groups to out-maneuver or out-position the player; others, such as the Manhack, fly directly at the player through small openings and tight corridors. Others use predictable but powerful attacks, while others hide before swiftly attacking the player. Gordon can kill most enemies with his weapons, or make use of indirect means, exploiting environmental hazards such as explosive pressurized canisters, gas fires or improvised traps. In chapter 10 and 11 of the game, Gordon can be joined by up to four armed Resistance soldiers or medics and can send his team further from him or call them back.

Many of the features use the Source engine's detailed physics simulation. Two sections of the game involve driving vehicles. Instead of button-oriented puzzles from Half-Life, environmental puzzles are also introduced with makeshift mechanical systems, revolving around the player's new ability to pick up, move, and place objects. Solutions involve objects' physical properties, such as shape, weight, and buoyancy. For example; In chapter three, "Route Kanal", the player is required to stack cinder blocks on a makeshift see-saw ramp to proceed over a wall. Alternatively, the player can build a crude staircase with the blocks, so the puzzle may be solved in multiple ways.

Part-way through the game, Gordon acquires the Gravity Gun, which allows him to draw distant objects towards himself or forcefully push them away, as well as the ability to manipulate larger and heavier objects that he cannot control without the weapon. These abilities are required to solve puzzles later in the game, and can also be used to great effect in combat, as any non-static object within proximity to the player has the potential to be used as a makeshift defense, such as a file cabinet, or a deadly projectile, such as a gasoline can or buzzsaw blade. The player can learn this through cleverly placed hints in the environment.

The game never separates the player with pre-rendered cutscenes or events; the story proceeds via exposition from other characters and in-world events, and the player can control Gordon for the entirety of the game. Much of the backstory to the game is simply alluded to or told through the environment. Even tutorials are mostly placed in the environment or in dialogue. The few pop-ups that actually appear only tell the player keybindings for actions.

Plot 
Half-Life 2 takes place approximately twenty years after the incident at the Black Mesa Research Facility from the first game, in which scientists accidentally opened a portal to the hostile dimension Xen. The game begins with Gordon Freeman being awoken from stasis by the mysterious G-Man (Michael Shapiro), who reveals that the Black Mesa incident attracted the attention of a multidimensional empire called the Combine, which conquered Earth in seven hours. The Combine have implemented a brutal police state by biologically assimilating humans and other species, including the peaceful Vortigaunts (Louis Gossett Jr. and Tony Todd). The G-Man inserts Gordon into a train arriving at City 17, the site of the Combine Citadel, where Dr. Wallace Breen (Robert Culp), the former Black Mesa administrator who negotiated Earth's surrender governs as the Combine's puppet ruler.

After eluding the Combine forces, Gordon joins a resistance led by former Black Mesa scientist Dr. Eli Vance (Robert Guillaume), which also includes Vance's daughter Alyx (Merle Dandridge), former Black Mesa security guard Barney Calhoun (Shapiro), who works undercover as a Civil Protection officer, and another Black Mesa scientist, Dr. Isaac Kleiner (Harry S. Robins). After a failed attempt to teleport to the resistance base, Black Mesa East, from Kleiner's makeshift laboratory, Gordon progresses on foot through the city's canal system. The teleportation attempt accidentally alerts Breen and the Combine to Freeman's return, leading to them sending forces to attack him. He obtains an airboat and battles through sewers and rivers.

At Black Mesa East, Gordon is reintroduced to Eli and meets another resistance scientist, Dr. Judith Mossman (Michelle Forbes). Alyx introduces Gordon to her pet robot, Dog, and gives him the gravity gun, an instrument that can manipulate large objects. When the base is attacked by Combine forces, Eli and Mossman are captured and taken to the Combine detention facility Nova Prospekt. Separated from Alyx, Gordon detours through the zombie-infested town of Ravenholm, aided by its last survivor, Father Grigori (Jim French). Escaping the town, Gordon discovers a resistance outpost. He uses a customized dune buggy to travel a crumbling coastal road to Nova Prospekt, fighting off alien antlions, and helping the resistance fend off Combine raids.

Gordon breaks into Nova Prospekt and reunites with Alyx. They locate Eli but discover that Mossman is a Combine informant. Before they can stop her, Mossman teleports herself and Eli back to City 17's Citadel. The Combine teleporter explodes moments after Gordon and Alyx use it to escape Nova Prospekt.

Returning to Kleiner's lab, Gordon and Alyx learn that the teleporter malfunctioned and that a week has passed. In their absence, the resistance has mobilized against the Combine. With the aid of Dog and Barney, Gordon fights his way inside the Citadel. A security system inadvertently supercharges Gordon's gravity gun, allowing him to fight his way up the Citadel.

Gordon is captured in a Combine transport pod and taken to Breen's office, where he and Mossman are waiting with Eli and Alyx in captivity. Breen explains his plans to further conquer humanity with the Combine, contrary to what he told Mossman. Angry, Mossman frees Gordon, Alyx, and Eli before Breen can teleport them off-world. Breen tries to escape through a teleporter, but Gordon destroys its reactor with energy orbs launched from a gravity gun, killing Breen. Just as the reactor explodes, the G-Man reappears and freezes time. He praises Gordon's work and mentions offers for Gordon's "services", before placing him back into stasis.

Development 

Development of Half-Life 2 began in June 1999, six months after the release of the original Half-Life. It was developed by a team of 82. With voice actors included, this number is 100. Valve's president, Gabe Newell, wanted to redefine the FPS genre, saying: "Why spend four years of your life building something that isn't innovative and is basically pointless? If Half-Life 2 isn't viewed as the best PC game of all time, it's going to completely bum out most of the guys on this team." Newell gave his team no deadline and a "virtually unlimited" budget, promising to fund the project himself if necessary. The game was built with Valve's new in-house game engine, Source, developed simultaneously.

Whereas Half-Life was set in a single location, the Black Mesa research facility, Valve wanted "a much more epic and global feel" for the sequel. One concept had the player teleporting between planets, which was discarded as it would make continuity between levels difficult. At the suggestion of the Bulgarian art director Viktor Antonov, the team settled on a city in an Eastern European location. In this early concept, players would start the game by boarding the Borealis, an icebreaker bound for the city. Nova Prospekt was conceived as a small rail depot built on an old prison in the wasteland and grew from a stopping-off point to the destination itself.

After observing how players had connected to minor characters in Half-Life, the team developed the characterization, with more detailed character models and realistic animation. The animator Ken Birdwell studied the work of psychologist Paul Ekman, who had researched how facial muscles express emotion. The writer Marc Laidlaw created family relationships between the characters, saying as it was a "basic dramatic unit everyone understands" rarely used in games.

The team integrated the Havok physics engine, which simulates real-world physics, to reinforce the player's sense of presence and create new gameplay. To experiment, the team created a minigame, Zombie Basketball, in which players used a physics-manipulating gun to throw zombies through hoops. In mid-2001, to test the engine, Valve built a street war between rioting citizens and police, featuring tanks, Molotov cocktails, hand-to-hand fighting, and looting. The designer John Guthrie described it as "an early attempt at getting something – anything – in the game that used non-player characters and physics".

In late 2001, Valve began creating a showreel, hoping to demonstrate it at E3 2002. For several months, Newell let the team work without his input so he could provide unbiased feedback, and focused on developing Steam, Valve's upcoming digital distribution service. The team presented the showreel to Newell, showcasing physics, environments such as the Borealis, and a dialogue-heavy scene with the scientist character Dr. Kleiner. Newell felt the showreel did not adequately show how the physics would affect gameplay and that the Kleiner scene was overlong. Reflecting on the failure, Laidlaw said: "The dramatic scenes with the characters are important, but they have to be in service of the interactivity and gameplay."

In September 2002, the team completed a second showreel, featuring a buggy race along the City 17 coast, an encounter with headcrabs on a pier, an alien strider attacking the city, and a greatly shortened Kleiner sequence. In October, Newell told the team they would announce Half-Life 2 at E3 2003 and release it by the end of the year. As with the original Half-Life, the team split into "cabals" working on different levels. Designers created levels using placeholder shapes and surfaces, which then were worked on by the artists. Valve announced Half-Life 2 at E3 2003, with demonstrations of the characters, animation, and physics. The reaction was positive, and the game won the E3 Game of the Show award. Newell also announced a release date, September 30, 2003, hoping this would motivate the team. They worked long hours to meet the deadline, but by July it had become clear they would miss it. Rumors spread of a delay, but Valve made no announcement until September 23, when they released a statement targeting a "holiday" release, leading to fan backlash.

Newell had been hesitant to announce a delay without a new release date. He said later: "We were paralyzed. We knew we weren't going to make the date we promised, and that was going to be a huge fiasco and really embarrassing. But we didn't have a new date to give people either." The graphics card manufacturer ATI had arranged a promotional event on Alcatraz to coincide with the planned release of Half-Life 2; Newell, unable to pull out of the event, gave a prepared speech, demonstrated the Source engine, and left without addressing questions.

On September 19, the Half-Life 2 source code was obtained by a German hacker, Axel Gembe, who had infiltrated Valve's internal network months earlier. According to Gembe, he shared it with another person, who leaked the code online in early October. Fans soon compiled a playable version of Half-Life 2, revealing how unfinished it was. The leaks damaged morale at Valve and slowed development. In March 2004, Gembe contacted Newell and identified himself, saying he was a fan and had not acted maliciously. Newell worked with the FBI to invite Gembe to a fake job interview, planning to have him arrested in the United States; however, police arrested him in Germany. In November 2006, Gembe was sentenced to three years' probation.

In 2004, the development team returned after Christmas to long hours, stressful working conditions, and no guarantee that the game, which was costing $1 million a month to develop, would be finished soon. However, Newell felt that progress was speeding up, with the team producing about three hours of gameplay per month. In March, they created the first version playable from start to finish and stopped production for a week to play through the game. Major changes by this point included the cutting of the Borealis sequence, the replacement of the jet ski with a hovercraft, and the physics-manipulating gravity gun being introduced earlier in the game. Feedback was positive across the company. Newell recalled: "The fact that you could go from one end of the game to the other was a really big thing for us. Then we knew it just had to get better –  but it was all there." After several months of bug fixes and playtesting, Half-Life 2 was completed on October 13, 2004.

Release 
Valve made a 1GB portion of Half-Life 2 available for download in an encrypted format through Steam on August 26, 2004. On the day of release, Steam customers were able to pay, unlock the files, and play the game immediately, without having to wait for the game to download. In retail, distribution of the game was handled by Vivendi Universal Games through their Sierra Entertainment subsidiary.

Half-Life 2 was simultaneously released through Steam, CD, and on DVD in several editions. Through Steam, Half-Life 2 had three packages that a customer could order. The basic version ("Bronze") includes only Half-Life 2 and Counter-Strike: Source, whereas the "Silver" and "Gold" (collector's edition) versions also include Half-Life: Source (ports of the original Half-Life and Day of Defeat mod to the new engine). The collector's edition/"Gold" version additionally includes merchandise, such as a baseball cap, a strategy guide and CD containing the soundtrack used in Half-Life 2. Both the disc and Steam versions require Steam to be installed and active for play to occur. The retail copies of the game came in two versions, standard and Collector's Edition.  The Collector's Edition differed from the physical items in the "Gold" edition, and included a T-shirt and sample of the Prima strategy guide.

A demo version with the file size of a single CD was made available in December 2004 at the web site of graphics card manufacturer ATI Technologies, who teamed up with Valve for the game. The demo contains a portion of two chapters: Point Insertion and "We Don't Go To Ravenholm...". In September 2005, Electronic Arts distributed the Game of the Year edition of Half-Life 2. Compared to the original CD-release of Half-Life 2, the Game of the Year edition also includes Half-Life: Source.

The soundtrack was written by Kelly Bailey. The Soundtrack of Half-Life 2, containing most of the music from Half-Life 2 and many tracks from the original Half-Life, was included with the Half-Life 2  "Gold" edition and sold separately from Valve's online store. Valve released a deathmatch mode in 2004.

Cyber café dispute 
On September 20, 2004, GameSpot reported that Sierra's parent company, Vivendi Universal Games, was in a legal battle with Valve over the distribution of Half-Life 2 to cyber cafés. At this time, cyber cafés were important for the Asian PC gaming market where PC and broadband penetration per capita were much lower (except Hong Kong, Malaysia, Singapore, South Korea, Japan and Taiwan).

According to Vivendi Universal Games, the distribution contract they signed with Valve included cyber cafés. This would mean that only Vivendi Universal Games could distribute Half-Life 2 to cyber cafés — not Valve through the Steam system. On November 29, 2004, Judge Thomas S. Zilly, of U.S. Federal District Court in Seattle, Washington, ruled that Vivendi Universal Games and its affiliates are not authorized to distribute (directly or indirectly) Valve games through cyber cafés to end users for pay-to-play activities according to the parties' current publishing agreement. Also, Judge Zilly ruled in favor of the Valve motion regarding the contractual limitation of liability, allowing Valve to recover copyright damages for any infringement as allowed by law without regard to the publishing agreement's limitation of liability clause.

On April 29, 2005, the two parties announced a settlement agreement. Vivendi Universal Games would cease distributing all retail packaged versions of Valve games by August 31, 2005. Vivendi Universal Games also was to notify distributors and cyber cafés that had been licensed by Vivendi Universal Games that only Valve had the authority to distribute cyber café licenses, and hence their licenses were revoked and switched to Valve's. Valve subsequently partnered with Electronic Arts for the retail distribution of its games, including the forthcoming Xbox version of Half-Life 2.

Ports and updates 
In 2005, Valve released an extra level, Lost Coast, as a free download to anyone who purchased Half-Life 2. On December 22, Valve released a 64-bit version of the Source engine for x86-64 processor-based systems running Windows XP Professional x64 Edition, Windows Server 2003 x64, Windows Vista x64, or Windows Server 2008 x64. This update enabled Half-Life 2 and other Source games to run natively on 64-bit processors, bypassing the 32-bit compatibility layer. Newell said it was "an important step in the evolution of our game content and tools", and that the game benefited greatly from the update. Some users reported major performance boosts, though the technology site Techgage found stability problems and no notable frame rate improvement.

In 2006, Valve partnered with Taito to release Half-Life 2: Survivor, an arcade game version for the Japanese market. Valve rereleased Half-Life 2 as part of the 2007 compilation The Orange Box for Windows, Xbox 360 and PlayStation 3. On May 26, 2010, Half-Life 2 and its two episodic sequels were released for Mac OS X. In 2013, Valve ported Half-Life 2 to Linux and released a free update adding support for the Oculus Rift virtual reality headset. An NVIDIA Shield-exclusive port for Android was released on May 12, 2014. In January 2022, a new UI designed for Valve's portable Steam Deck device was released.

Reception 

Half-Life 2 has an aggregate score of 96/100 on Metacritic. Sources such as 1UP, GameSpy, The Cincinnati Enquirer, The New York Times, and VideoGamer.com gave it perfect scores, and others, such as PC Gamer, IGN, GamesRadar, and Eurogamer, gave near-perfect scores. It was the fifth game to receive ten out of ten from Edge. Critics praised the advanced graphics and physics. Maximum PC awarded Half-Life 2 11 on their rating scale which normally peaks at 10, calling it "the best game ever made".

In the United States, Half-Life 2s PC version sold 680,000 copies and had earned $34.3 million by August 2006. It was the country's 17th best-selling PC game between January 2000 and August 2006. It received a "Platinum" sales award from the Entertainment and Leisure Software Publishers Association (ELSPA), indicating sales of at least 300,000 copies in the United Kingdom. Forbes reported on February 9, 2011, that the game had sold 12 million copies worldwide.

In a review of The Orange Box, IGN stated that although Half-Life 2 has already been released through other media, the game itself is still enjoyable on a console. They also noted that the physics of Half-Life 2 are impressive despite being a console game. However, it was noted that the graphics on the Xbox 360 version of Half-Life 2 were not as impressive as when it was released on the PC. GameSpot's review of The Orange Box noticed that the content of both the Xbox 360 releases, and PlayStation 3 releases were exactly alike, the only issue with the PlayStation 3 version was that it had noticeable frame-rate hiccups. GameSpot continued to say that the frame rates issues were only minor but some consider them to be a significant irritation.

Several critics, including some that had given positive reviews, complained about the required usage of the program Steam, the requirement to create an account, register the products, and permanently lock them to the account before being allowed to play, along with installation difficulties and lack of support.

Awards 
Half-Life 2 earned 39 Game of the Year awards, including Overall Game of the Year at IGN, GameSpot's Award for Best Shooter, GameSpot'''s Reader's Choice — PC Game of the Year Award, "Game of the Year" from the Interactive Achievement Awards and "Best Game" with the Game Developers Choice Awards, where it was also given various awards for technology, characters, and writing.

The editors of Computer Gaming World nominated Half-Life 2 for their 2004 "Single-Player Shooter of the Year" and overall "Game of the Year" awards, although it lost to Painkiller and World of Warcraft. They wrote, "Half-Life 2, everyone's default pick to win this year, is indeed a fantastic roller coaster of a ride, not as great as the original but still leagues above most other shooters."Edge awarded Half-Life 2 with its top honor of the year with the award for Best Game, as well as awards for Innovation and Visual Design. The game also had a strong showing at the 2004 British Academy Video Games Awards, picking up six awards, more than any other game that night, with awards including "Best Game" and "Best Online and Multiplayer." Computer Games Magazine named Half-Life 2 the fourth-best computer game of 2004. The editors call it "a masterful single-player experience that plays a constant game of one-upmanship with itself." It won the magazine's "Best Technology" (beating out Doom 3) and "Best Writing" awards, and was a runner-up in the "Best Sound Effects", "Best AI" and "Best Voice Acting" categories.Guinness World Records awarded Half-Life 2 the world record for "Highest Rated Shooter by PC Gamer Magazine" in the Guinness World Records: Gamer's Edition 2008. Other records awarded the game in the book include, "Largest Digital Distribution Channel" for Valve's Steam service, "First Game to Feature a Gravity Gun", and "First PC Game to Feature Developer Commentary". In 2009, Game Informer put Half-Life 2 5th on their list of "The Top 200 Games of All Time", saying that "With Half-Life 2, Valve redefined the way first-person shooters were created".Half-Life 2 was selected by readers of The Guardian as the best game of the decade, with praise given especially to the environment design throughout the game. According to the newspaper, it "pushed the envelope for the genre, and set a new high watermark for FPS narrative". One author commented: "Half-Life 2 always felt like the European arthouse answer to the Hollywood bluster of Halo and Call of Duty". Half-Life 2 won Crispy Gamer's Game of the Decade tournament style poll. It also won Reviews on the Run's, IGNs Best Game of the Decade and Spike Video Game Awards 2012 Game of the Decade. In December 2021, IGN named Half-Life 2 the ninth-best game of all time.

 Mods 

Since the release of the Source engine SDK, a large number of modifications (mods) have been developed by the Half-Life 2 community. Mods vary in scale, from fan-created levels and weapons, to partial conversions such as Rock 24, Half-Life 2 Substance and SMOD (which modify the storyline and gameplay of the pre-existing game), SourceForts and Garry's Mod (which allow the player to experiment with the physics system in a sandbox mode), to total conversions such as Black Mesa, Dystopia, Zombie Master or Iron Grip: The Oppression, the last of which transforms the game from a first-person shooter into a real-time strategy game. Some mods take place in the Half-Life universe; others in completely original settings. Many more mods are still in development, including Lift, The Myriad, Operation Black Mesa, and the episodic single-player mod Minerva. Several multiplayer mods, such as Pirates, Vikings and Knights II, a predominately sword-fighting game; Insurgency: Modern Infantry Combat, which focuses on realistic modern infantry combat; and Jailbreak Source have been opened to the public as a beta. As part of its community support, Valve announced in September 2008 that several mods, with more planned in the future, were being integrated into the Steamworks program, allowing the mods to make full use of Steam's distribution and update capabilities. In Sept 2022, after a decade of development, a fan made full-VR mod was released titled "Half Life 2: VR Mod".

 Sequels Half-Life 2 was followed by two episodic sequels: Episode One (2006) and Episode Two (2007). After canceling Episode Three and several further Half-Life projects, Valve released a prequel, Half-Life: Alyx'', in 2020.

See also

References

External links 

 

2004 video games
AIAS Game of the Year winners
Alien invasions in video games
Amputees in fiction
Android (operating system) games
British Academy Games Award for Best Game winners
British Academy Games Award for Multiplayer winners
D.I.C.E. Award for Action Game of the Year winners
Dystopian video games
Fiction about rebellions
First-person shooters
Game Developers Choice Award for Game of the Year winners
Golden Joystick Award winners
Half-Life (series)
Interactive Achievement Award winners
Laboratories in fiction
Linux games
MacOS games
Oculus Rift games
PlayStation 3 games
Post-apocalyptic video games
Propaganda in fiction
Science fiction video games
Sierra Entertainment games
Single-player video games
Source (game engine) games
Spike Video Game Award winners
Sterilization in fiction
Teleportation in fiction
Trains in fiction
Valve Corporation games
Video game sequels
Video games about mass surveillance
Video games developed in the United States
Video games scored by Kelly Bailey
Video games set in Eastern Europe
Video games set in the 2020s
Video games using Havok
War video games
Windows games
Xbox 360 games
Xbox games